The Tauraroa River is a river of the Northland Region of New Zealand's North Island. It flows west from near the North Auckland Peninsula's east coast 15 kilometres southwest of Whangarei, reaching the Manganui River 15 kilometres east of Dargaville.

See also
List of rivers of New Zealand

References

Rivers of the Northland Region
Rivers of New Zealand
Kaipara Harbour catchment